WMLZ-LP (107.9) is a low-power High School radio station. The station is licensed to Bedford Public Schools in Temperance, Michigan.

History
WMLZ-LP first began broadcasting in 2002 under the name of Blend 107.9, where it played a mix of 1980s music and current hits. The format was then changed in 2006 to incorporate a wide time range classic rock, and the station changed its name to Z108. In February 2018, the station shifted towards a variety hits format, branded as 107.9 Memories. WMLZ-LP also aired Bedford High School's football and basketball games. In 2022, the station fell silent.

References

External links

MLZ-LP
MLZ
Radio stations established in 2002
Monroe County, Michigan
High school radio stations in the United States
2002 establishments in Michigan